Stonyfield may refer to:

 Stonyfield Farm, New Hampshire, US
Stoneyfield, also spelled Stonyfield, ancient stone circle near Huntly, Scotland